Benny Wesley Collins (April 1, 1921 – November 20, 2014) was an American football player, coach, and college athletics administrator. He served as the head football coach at Texas Western College—now the University of Texas at El Paso (UTEP)—from 1957 to 1961, compiling a record of 18–29–1.

Collins was a star halfback at West Texas State College—now West Texas A&M University in Canyon, Texas. In 1941, he finished second in the nation in scored points with 132, behind Bill Dudley (134) of Virginia. Collins was selected by the Detroit Lions as the 185th overall pick in the 1942 NFL draft.

Collins worked at Texas Western College from 1946 to 1961 and served as the school's athletic director and head football coach during his final five years. Collins is known for hiring renowned college basketball coach Don Haskins in 1961. In an article for the El Paso Times, Haskins is quoted saying, "[Collins] was behind me all the way."

Collins, 93, and his wife, Mary Gene, 86, were killed November 20, 2014, when they were struck by a pickup truck while crossing a busy street in El Paso.

Head coaching record

References

1921 births
2014 deaths
American football halfbacks
UTEP Miners athletic directors
UTEP Miners football coaches
West Texas A&M Buffaloes football players
Road incident deaths in Texas